Seomun Market Station is a station of Daegu Subway Line 3 in Daesin-dong, and Sijangbungno, Jung District, Daegu, South Korea. It is named after Seomun Market, and is also called Dongsan Medical Center Station.

See also 
 Seomun Market
 Keimyung University Dongsan Medical Center

External links 
 

Daegu Metro stations
Jung District, Daegu
Railway stations opened in 2015
2015 establishments in South Korea